Life as It Comes is a 2003  Italian drama film directed by Stefano Incerti.

Cast 

Claudio Santamaria: Marco
Valeria Bruni Tedeschi: Paola
Stefania Sandrelli: Meri
Daniele Liotti: Max
Alessandro Haber: Beppe
Stefania Rocca: Giorgia 
Tony Musante: The Professor 
Lorenza Indovina: Laura

References

External links

2003 films
Italian drama films
2003 drama films
2000s Italian films